Ba'kelalan Airport  is an airport in Ba'kelalan, a town in the state of Sarawak in Malaysia.

Airlines and destinations

Incidents
 On 13 September 2008 a DHC-6 Twin Otter overshot the runway while landing. All fourteen people on board survived.

See also
 List of airports in Malaysia

References

External links
 Short Take-Off and Landing Airports (STOL) at Malaysia Airports Holdings Berhad
 

Airports in Sarawak
Lawas District